The second series of Made in Chelsea, a British structured-reality television programme, began airing on 19 September 2011 on E4. The series concluded on 21 November 2011 after 10 episodes, however an end of season party episode aired on 28 November 2011 which was hosted by Rick Edwards and featured the cast members reuniting to discuss everything from the series. Filming for the series began on 29 July 2011. This series featured the arrival of several new cast members including Alice Davidson, Chloe Green, Jamie Laing, Oliver Proudlock and Victoria Baker-Harber as well as the reintroduction of Louise Thompson, the ex-girlfriend of Spencer Matthews who briefly appeared during the first series. On 22 December 2011, the show's first Christmas special aired. The series included a rift forming between Binky and Cheska as they're forced to pick sides with Gabriella and Ollie, Spencer breaking off his brief fling with Louise to chase after Caggie again, and the breakdown of Hugo and Millie's relationship when it's announced that both have cheated on each other, leading up to Millie exposing Hugo's night with Rosie to a room full of guests.

Cast

Episodes

{| class="wikitable plainrowheaders" style="width:100%; background:#fff;"
|- style="color:white"
! style="background:#0057AE;"| SeriesNo.
! style="background:#0057AE;"| EpisodeNo.
! style="background:#0057AE;"| Title
! style="background:#0057AE;"| Original airdate
! style="background:#0057AE;"| Duration
! style="background:#0057AE;"| UK viewers

|}

Ratings

External links

References

2011 British television seasons
Made in Chelsea seasons